Let's Hear It for the Dogs is the tenth studio album from Scottish folk rock duo The Proclaimers, released in 2015 on the label Cooking Vinyl.

Recording
The album was recorded at Rockfield Studios in Wales and produced by Dave Eringa. As stated by member Charlie Reid, the decision to have Eringa produce Let's Hear It for the Dogs was brought about by an admiration for his work with Manic Street Preachers, and on the Johnson and Daltrey album Going Back Home.

Release
Let's Hear It for the Dogs was released in 2015 through Cooking Vinyl records in the UK on CD and vinyl. In North America, the album was released on CD in May 2015 through Compass Records.

Content and style

Lyrics and themes 
The lyrical themes of Let's Hear It for the Dogs included a number of emotionally-charged topics. "Then Again" appertained to Jimmy Savile and BBC sexual abuse scandals, while "What School?" was a reflection on Scottish religious tension. Lighter moments of the album included "Ten Tiny Fingers", a father-daughter tribute, while "Tuesday Afternoon" was adjudged by AllMusic to be an "epic love-story".

Musical style and arrangements 
Let's Hear It for the Dogs is characterized by heavy utilization of electric guitars and drums, with certain tracks incorporating strings ("Tuesday Afternoon") and horns ("Then Again").

Critical reception

Marcy Donelson of AllMusic praised Let's Hear it for the Dogs, observing that "after ten studio albums, they still bring intensity to their down-to-earth, grandly lilting, [...] spirited output".

Track listing

Personnel

 The Proclaimers
 Craig Reid - vocals
 Charlie Reid - acoustic guitar, vocals

 Additional personnel

 Stevie Christie - keyboards 
 Sean Genockey - guitar
 Matt Holland - brass
 Clive Jenner - drums 
 Bernard Kane - viola
 Garry John Kane - bass
 Rose Lawrence - sleeve design
 Kenny MacDonald - photography
 Lewis MacDonald - cover design
 Murdro MacLeod - photography
 Nathan Stone - cello
 The Vulcan String Quartet - strings
 Andrew Walters - violin 
 Joanna Walters - violin
 Zac Ware - electric guitar 
 Martin Winning - brass

 Technical
 Dave Eringa - mixing, production
 Joe Jones - engineering 
 Ed Woods - mastering

Charts

References

2015 albums
Cooking Vinyl albums
The Proclaimers albums
Albums recorded at Rockfield Studios